Mingus is the tenth studio album by Canadian musician Joni Mitchell. It was released on June 13, 1979 and was her last studio album for Asylum Records. The album is a collaboration between Mitchell and Charles Mingus. It was recorded in the months before and after Mingus' death in January 1979 and is wholly dedicated to him.

The album is one of Mitchell's most experimental and jazz-centric works. Mingus originally wrote six compositions (entitled "Joni I-VI") for Mitchell to write lyrics for; three of these pieces were included on the album. Two other tracks written exclusively by Mitchell are included, alongside a new version of Mingus' jazz standard "Goodbye Pork Pie Hat", featuring lyrics written by Mitchell. In addition to these, five spoken word tracks (denoted as "raps") are dispersed throughout the album.

Mitchell is backed on the album by Jaco Pastorius (who had also contributed to Mitchell's past two albums) on fretless bass, Wayne Shorter on saxophone, Herbie Hancock on electric piano, Peter Erskine on drums and Don Alias on percussion.

Mingus received mixed-to-positive reviews from critics and peaked at number 17 in the US. "The Dry Cleaner from Des Moines" was released as a single to promote the album, but did not chart. Mitchell would tour to promote the album through 1979-80; performances from these concerts would be documented on the live album Shadows and Light (1980).

Track listing

Personnel
Sources:

Musicians
Prior to recording the album, Mitchell had several "experimental sessions" with New York musicians who had worked with Mingus. These musicians included:

The recordings of the  "experimental sessions", rumored to have been lost, destroyed, or made otherwise unavailable have become available as bootleg tapes.

The personnel on the actual album were:

Technical
Mixed by Joni Mitchell, Henry Lewy and Steve Katz
Mastered by Bernie Grundman 
Personal Management: Elliot Roberts
Paintings by Joni Mitchell
Art direction: Glen Christensen

Recorded at A&M Studios in Hollywood by Henry Lewy and Steve Katz 
Additional recordings at Electric Lady Studios, New York by Henry Lewy and Jerry Solomon

Charts

See also
River: The Joni Letters

References

1979 albums
Joni Mitchell albums
Asylum Records albums
Charles Mingus
Albums recorded at A&M Studios
Albums recorded at Electric Lady Studios
Albums with cover art by Joni Mitchell
Charles Mingus tribute albums